Hypolestes is a damselfly genus. It makes up the monotypic subfamily Hypolestinae of the flatwing damselfly family Hypolestidae.

Species include:
 Hypolestes clara
 Hypolestes trinitatis
 Hypolestes hatuey

References

Zygoptera genera
Taxonomy articles created by Polbot